Lee W. Graber (born 1946) is an American orthodontist who is the recipient of the Albert H. Ketcham Award in 2012. He also co-authored the textbook Orthodontics: Current Principles and Techniques  along with his father Thomas M. Graber. He is a past president of World Federation of Orthodontists.

Life
He received his dental degree from University of Michigan School of Dentistry. He also received his master's degree in Anatomy from Michigan Dental School. He then pursued his PhD in growth and development at University of Michigan also. He received his Orthodontic Training at Northwestern University Dental School. Dr. Graber is co-editor of the 6th edition of the textbook Orthodontics: Current Principles and Techniques. The initial edition of this textbook was written by his late father, Dr. T.M. Graber.

He currently practices at a private practice in Illinois, with his daughter. They have offices in Vernon Hills and Glenview.

Positions and awards
 Illinois Society of Orthodontists, president
 Midwestern Society of Orthodontists, president and trustee
 World Federation of Orthodontists, president, 2000–2005
 WFO's first executive committee, 1995–2000
 American Association of Orthodontists, president
 Albert H. Ketcham Award, 2012
 ISO Merit Awards

References

American orthodontists
Living people
University of Michigan School of Dentistry alumni
1946 births